Samson Jolaoluwa Gbolohan Tovide (born 4 January 2004) is an English footballer who plays as a centre-forward for  club Colchester United.

Career
Tovide began his career in the academy at Leyton Orient, before moving on to Colchester United.

Tovide travelled with Colchester's first-team squad for their season-opening fixture at Bradford City on 12 September 2020. He made the bench but did not make an appearance. He made his first-team debut as a substitute for Jevani Brown during Colchester's 6–1 Essex derby win against Southend United in the EFL Trophy on 10 November 2020. He made his English Football League debut on 8 October 2021, coming on as a late substitute for Frank Nouble in Colchester's 2–0 defeat by Tranmere Rovers.

He was sent off on his first league start for the club when he handled the ball in the penalty area during Colchester's 3–1 home defeat by Sutton United on 26 October 2021.

After that unfortunate start Tovide found first team opportunities hard to come by - appearing just four more times that season, each time coming off the bench late on in matches with just a few minutes left.

The 2022/23 season started in a similar vein with his first team opportunities limited to appearances off the bench and then by injury. It wasn't until after Colchester, then struggling against relegation near the bottom of EFL League Two, appointed Matt Bloomfield as Head Coach in September 2023 that Tovide got his next start, appearing in a 0-1 defeat at Crewe Alexandra, putting in a performance Bloomfield described as "Absolutely brilliant".

Tovide was picked to start the next game and scored his first English Football League goal – a long-range, left footed shot from outside the area – in a 3-0 win over Doncaster Rovers to help move Colchester out of the EFL League Two relegation zone. 

The match was notable as all three goals were scored from outside the penalty area though former Republic of Ireland international Clinton Morrison said Tovide's was "the best one". Indeed, Tovide's goal was nominated for the EFL League Two 'Goal of the Month' for November though lost out in the vote, coincidentally to Doncaster Rovers' Harrison Biggins for his goal against Grimsby Town earlier in the month.

Career statistics

References

External links
Profile at the Colchester United F.C. website

Living people
English footballers
Footballers from the London Borough of Hackney
Association football forwards
Colchester United F.C. players
2004 births
English Football League players
Black British sportspeople
English people of Nigerian descent